A townhouse, townhome, town house, or town home, is a type of terraced housing. A modern townhouse is often one with a small footprint on multiple floors. In a different British usage, the term originally referred to any type of city residence (normally in London) of someone whose main or largest residence was a country house.

History
Historically, a townhouse was the city residence of a noble or wealthy family, who would own one or more country houses in which they lived for much of the year. From the 18th century, landowners and their servants would move to a townhouse during the social season (when major balls took place).

Europe

In the United Kingdom, most townhouses are terraced. Only a small minority of them, generally the largest, were detached, but even aristocrats whose country houses had grounds of hundreds or thousands of acres often lived in terraced houses in town.

North America
In the United States and Canada, a townhouse has two connotations. The older predates the automobile and denotes a house on a small footprint in a city, but because of its multiple floors (sometimes six or more), it has a large living space, often with servants' quarters. The small footprint of the townhouse allows it to be within walking or mass-transit distance of business and industrial areas of the city, yet luxurious enough for wealthy residents of the city.

Townhouses are expensive where detached single-family houses are uncommon, such as in New York City, Chicago, Boston, Philadelphia, Montreal, Washington, D.C., and San Francisco.

Rowhouses are similar and consist of several adjacent, uniform units originally found in older, pre-automobile urban areas such as Baltimore, Philadelphia, Richmond, Virginia, Charleston, South Carolina, Savannah, Georgia and New Orleans, but now found in lower-cost housing developments in suburbs as well. A rowhouse is where there is a continuous roof and foundation, and a single wall divides adjacent townhouses, but some have a double wall with inches-wide air space in between on a common foundation. A rowhouse will generally be smaller and less luxurious than a dwelling called a townhouse.

The name townhouse or townhome was later used to describe non-uniform units in suburban areas that are designed to mimic detached or semi-detached homes. Today, the term townhouse is used to describe units mimicking a detached home that are attached in a multi-unit complex. The distinction between living units called apartments and those called townhouses is that townhouses usually consist of multiple floors and have their own outside door as opposed to having only one level and/or having access via an interior corridor hallway or via an exterior balcony-style walkway (more common in the warmer climates). Another distinction is that in most areas of the US outside of the very largest cities, apartment refers to rental housing, and townhouse typically refers to an individually owned dwelling, with no other unit beneath or above although the term townhouse-style (rental) apartment is also heard for bi-level apartments.

Townhouses can also be "stacked". Such homes have multiple units vertically (typically two), normally each with its own private entrance from the street or at least from the outside. They can be side by side in a row of three or more, in which case they are sometimes referred to as rowhouses. A townhouse in a group of two could be referred to as a townhouse, but in Canada and the US, it is typically called a semi-detached home and in some areas of western Canada, a half-duplex.

In Canada, single-family dwellings, be they any type, such as single-family detached homes, apartments, mobile homes, or townhouses, for example, are split into two categories of ownership:

 Condominium (strata title), where one owns the interior of the unit and also a specified share of the undivided interest of the remainder of the building and land known as common elements.
 Freehold, where one owns exclusively the land and the dwelling without any condominium aspects. These may share the foundation as well but have narrow air spaces between and still referred to as a townhouse.

Condominium townhouses, just like condominium apartments, are often referred to as condos, thus referring to the type of ownership rather than to the type of dwelling. Since apartment style condos are the most common, when someone refers to a condo, many erroneously assume that it must be an apartment-style dwelling and that only apartment-style dwellings can be condos. All types of dwellings can be condos, and this is therefore true of townhouses. A brownstone townhouse is a particular variety found in New York.

Asia, Australia, South Africa, Zimbabwe

In Asia, Australia, South Africa and Zimbabwe, the usage of the term follows the North American sense. Townhouses are generally found in complexes. Large complexes often have high security, resort facilities such as swimming pools, gyms, parks and playground equipment. Typically, a townhouse has a strata title; i.e., a type of title where the common property (landscaped area, public corridors, building structure, etc.) is owned by a corporation of individual owners and the houses on the property are owned by the individual owners.

In population-dense Asian cities dominated by high-rise residential apartment blocks, such as Hong Kong, townhouses in private housing developments remain almost exclusively populated by the very wealthy due to the rarity and relatively large sizes of the units. Commonly in the suburbs of major cities, an old house on a large block of land is demolished and replaced by a short row of townhouses, built 'end on' to the street for added privacy.

See also

 Creole townhouse
 Duplex
 List of house types
 Multi-family residential
 Shophouse
 Sobrado (Portugal and Brazil)
 Streetcar suburb
 Terraced house
 Townhouse (Great Britain)

References

Further reading
 Cunningham, Peter. Handbook of London Past and Present, London, 1850 (see section 20: "Palaces & Chief Houses of the Nobility & Gentry in the Present Day").
 Daisy, Countess of Fingall. Seventy Years Young . First published in 1937 (autobiography of an Irish peer's wife, covering the late nineteenth and early twentieth centuries).

External links 
 

House styles
Housing